Events from the year 1839 in art.

Events
 January 9 – The French Academy of Sciences announces the Daguerreotype photography process.
 January 25 – H. Fox Talbot shows his "photogenic drawings" at the Royal Institution in London.
 c. October – Robert Cornelius takes a daguerreotype self-portrait, the earliest known existing photographic portrait of a human in America.
 Honoré de Balzac's novel Pierre Grassou concerns an artist who lives off forgeries.

Works

 John Bell – Babes in the Wood (sculpture)
 Sara Anne Bright – The Leaf (photogenic drawing)
 Francesco Hayez – Reclining Odalisque
 Edwin Landseer – Dignity and Impudence
 Carl Spitzweg – The Poor Poet
 J. M. W. Turner
 Ancient Rome – Agrippina Landing with the Ashes of Germanicus
 Modern Rome – Campo Vaccino
 Cicero at his Villa
 The Fighting Temeraire tugged to her last Berth to be broken up, 1838
 Peter von Hess – The entry of King Otto of Greece into Athens and his reception in front of the Thiseion temple in 1833
 Sir David Wilkie – General Sir David Baird Discovering the Body of Sultan Tippoo Sahib after having Captured Seringapatam, on the 4th May, 1799
 William Wyon – Una and the Lion (design for five pounds British gold coin)

Births
 January 19 – Paul Cézanne, French painter (died 1906)
 March 16 – John Butler Yeats, Irish painter (died 1922)
 May 24 – Arthur Quartley, painter (died 1886)
 June 9 – Joseph Paelinck, Belgian painter (born 1781)
 September 1 – Charles Edward Perugini, English painter (died 1918)
 October 2 – Hans Thoma, German painter (died 1924)
 October 29 – Kate Dickens Perugini, English painter (died 1929)
 October 30 – Alfred Sisley, French impressionist painter (died 1899)
 November 16 – William De Morgan, English ceramic artist (died 1917)
 November 20 – Christian Wilberg, painter (died 1882)
 date unknown – François Sallé, French realist painter (died 1899)

Deaths
 January 12 – Joseph Anton Koch, Austrian painter of the German Romantic movement (born 1768)
 January 14 – John Wesley Jarvis, American painter (born 1781)
 January 28 – Sir William Beechey, English portrait painter (born 1753)
 February 6 – François Louis Thomas Francia, French shorescape watercolorist (born 1772)
 February 8 – Giovanni Cendramini, Italian painter and engraver (born 1760)
 February 21 – John Charles Felix Rossi, English sculptor (born 1769)
 June 2 – Wijnand Nuijen, Dutch land- and seascape painter (born 1813)
 June 4 – Cornelia Scheffer, Dutch painter and portrait miniaturist (born 1769)
 July 8 – John Laporte, English landscape painter and etcher (born 1761)
 September 4 – Hendrik Voogd, Dutch painter and printmaker active in Italy (born 1768)
 September 10 – Pieter Fontijn, Dutch painter and drawer (born 1773)
 September 30 – John Thirtle, English watercolour painter and frame-maker (born 1777)
 November 15 – Giocondo Albertolli, Swiss-born architect, painter and sculptor active in Italy (born 1743)
 December – William Sadler, Irish landscape painter (born 1782)
 December 22 – Cornelis van Spaendonck, Dutch painter (born 1756)
 date unknown – Paolo Vincenzo Bonomini, Italian portrait and caricature painter (born 1757)

References

 
Years of the 19th century in art
1830s in art